Het Oude Loo (The Old Woods) is a 15th-century castle on the estate of Het Loo Palace in Apeldoorn in the Netherlands. The castle was built as a hunting lodge and is surrounded by a moat. The castle is currently used by the Dutch royal family as a country house and guest residence. It is not open to the public.

History 
The castle was built in the 15th century. In 1684, the castle and the surrounding land was bought by William III of Orange. On this land, he had Het Loo Palace built. The castle was used by the court as, among other things, an apothecary. In the 19th century the castle came into the hands of Louis Napoleon who filled up the moat. Queen Wilhelmina of the Netherlands had the castle and the moat restored by architect Pierre Cuypers. Since 1968, the castle has been owned by the Dutch state. In 1973, it became a national heritage site. The castle is currently used by the Dutch royal family as a country house and guest residence.

On 21 March 2022 it was announced that the property would be used to house 20-30 refugees fleeing the 2022 Russian invasion of Ukraine.

Gardens 

The gardens of the castle have a statue pond, a maze made out of beech trees, and an outdoor bowling alley. The gardens can be visited in the months of April and May.

References

External links 
 

Castles in Gelderland
Rijksmonuments in Apeldoorn
Palaces in the Netherlands
Royal residences in the Netherlands